The Juan Crisostomo Falcón National Park, also known as the Sierra de San Luis, is in the southern part of the Falcón state in Venezuela. It has an area of   covering the municipalities of Bolívar, Petit, and part of the municipalities of Colina and Miranda. It was created in 1987.

It features rich ecosystems  ranging from rain cloud forest to savannah. Much of it is covered with karst landscape with many caves and shafts, and the springs welling out from the flanks of the sierra provide water for Coro, Punto Fijo and Cumarebo, particularly the Paraguaná Peninsula and its oil refining industry.

See also
List of national parks of Venezuela

References

Tourist attractions in Falcón
National parks of Venezuela
Protected areas established in 1987
Forests of Venezuela
1987 establishments in Venezuela
Geography of Falcón